The Small and Medium Enterprise Administration (SMEA) is the administrative agency of the Ministry of Economic Affairs of the Taiwan (ROC) responsible for small and medium-sized enterprises-related affairs.

Organizational structure
 Policy Planning Division
 Management Consulting Division
 Business Start-up Division
 Incubation Division
 Information Technology Division
 Financing Division
 Secretariat
 Personnel Office
 Accounting Office
 Civil Service Office

Transportation
The agency is accessible within walking distance south east of Guting Station of Taipei Metro.

See also
 Ministry of Economic Affairs (Taiwan)
 Economy of Taiwan

References

External links
 

Executive Yuan
Organizations related to small and medium-sized enterprises